Bobby Lovett is an American historian. He is an emeritus professor of History at Tennessee State University, where he served as the dean of the College of Arts and Sciences from 1999 to 2009. He is the author of several books about African-American history.

Selected works

References

External links
Official website
Bobby Lovett on C-SPAN

Living people
People from Memphis, Tennessee
University of Arkansas alumni
Tennessee State University faculty
American university and college faculty deans
African-American historians
Year of birth missing (living people)
21st-century African-American people